Minuscule 676 (in the Gregory-Aland numbering) α 573 (Soden). It is a Greek minuscule manuscript of the New Testament, on 344 parchment leaves (19.6 cm by 15 cm). It is dated palaeographically to the 13th century. Written in one column per page, 28 lines per page in minuscule letters. It was labelled by Scrivener as 527e.

Description 

The codex contains the text of the four Gospels, Book of Acts, Pauline epistles, and catholic epistles, with some lacunae (Matthew 9:36-10:22; Mark 1:21-2:1; John 1:1-22).
The Old Testament quotations are marked with inverted comma (>).

It was written by several hands.

Text 

The Greek text of the codex is a representative of the Byzantine text-type. Aland placed it in Category V.
It was not examined by using the Claremont Profile Method.

History 

In 1422 it was held in church of St. George in ελαρανδω (?). The manuscript was bought in 1752 by Nicholas Trimodis. It was held in Ghent.

The manuscript was acquired along with seven other manuscripts (556, 677, 678, 679, 680, 681, and 682) by the late Sir Thomas Phillips, at Middle Hill in Worcestershire. These manuscripts were in the property of Mr. Fitzroy Fenwick, then at Thirlestaine House in Cheltenham.

The manuscript is located now in Bible Museum Münster (Ms. 2).

See also 

 List of New Testament minuscules
 Textual criticism
 Bible Museum Münster

References

External links 

 Images of Minuscule 676 at the CSNTM 
 Manuscripts of the Bible Museum

Greek New Testament minuscules
13th-century biblical manuscripts